Toy-Box is a Danish bubblegum pop group, consisting of vocalists Anila Mirza and Amir El-Falaki. Mirza was born on 8 October 1974 in Frederiksværk, Denmark to Indian-Iranian-Pakistani parents. El-Falaki was born 12 August 1973 in Copenhagen, Denmark to Moroccan parents. In 1999, they had some success in the Scandinavian music charts with a song from the album Fantastic, named "Tarzan & Jane". Toy-Box reunited and performed at the Vi Elsker 90'erne events in Denmark in 2017.

History
"Tarzan & Jane" was championed by Smash Hits magazine in the United Kingdom in 1999, but their UK label Edel decided to hold back the release until later on in the year, to coincide with the release of Disney's Tarzan.  They elected to release "Best Friend" first; although it received a lot of rotation on the television channel The Box, it only reached number 41 in the UK Singles Chart, and plans to release "Tarzan & Jane" were cancelled. It reached number 2 in the Dutch hit lists. "Tarzan & Jane" reached number 15 on the Eurochart Hot 100. In 1999 the song peaked at number 16 on MTV Europe.

Toy-Box's first album, Fantastic, included the hits "The Sailor Song", "Best Friend", "Super-Duper-Man", "Teddybear", and "Tarzan & Jane". It was released in September 1999 and followed in 2001 by a second album, Toy Ride, which includes fan-favorite songs "www.girl", "Prince of Arabia", and "Wizard of Oz".

After the group broke up, El-Falaki worked as a dance teacher, music video choreographer and trainer to F.C. Copenhagen's cheerleading team. Mirza later changed her first name to Aneela and began a solo career, with limited success. When asked about another Toy-Box release in 2007, Aneela said, "I don't know, anything's possible."

, Toy-Box has returned to tour alongside Aqua, Vengaboys, and many more for a series of 1990s concerts.

Discography

Studio albums

Singles

Promotional singles

See also
Aqua (band)

References

External links
 Toy-Box 
Toy-Box biography, news and discography at Bubblegum Dancer

Bubblegum pop groups
Danish dance music groups
Danish Eurodance groups
Danish pop music groups
Musical groups established in 1995
Musical groups disestablished in 2003
Musical groups reestablished in 2012
English-language singers from Denmark
Victor Entertainment artists
People from Hillerød Municipality